A. Tamizh Magan Hussain (born 1936) is an Indian politician and Presidium Chairman of the All India Anna Dravida Munnetra Kazhagam party from 23 June 2022. Being One of the founding members of All India Anna Dravida Munnetra Kazhagam, He also served as All World M.G.R. Forum Secretary. He is the Former Chairperson of Tamil Nadu Waqf Board. 

Hussian was one of those 11 party cadres who signed the form to register AIADMK as a political party led by M. G. Ramachandran. Since the formation of the party in 1972, Hussain has held some crucial posts in the party. He served as the first AIADMK district secretary of Kanyakumari.

On 1 December 2021, He was made interim  Presidium Chairman of the party. On 23 June 2022, A. Tamil Magan Hussain was unanimously elected as the Presidium Chairman of the party at a general council meeting held at the Shrivaaru Venkatachalapathy Palace in Vanagaram, Chennai.

References 

1930s births
Year of birth uncertain
All India Anna Dravida Munnetra Kazhagam politicians

1936 births
Living people